John Mockler (politician) (born 1941), California State official
John Mockler (hurler)
Percy Paul Mockler (born April 14, 1949), Canadian Senator and former New Brunswick MLA
Bob Mockler (born in Horse and Jockey, County Tipperary), Irish sportsperson
Frank Mockler, 47th Governor of American Samoa
E. Jayne Mockler, Democratic member of the Wyoming Senate